Kuksu or Kuksi is a Korean noodle dish popular among Koreans in Uzbekistan. It is served cold and often spicy with beef.

The dish is a popular menu item at Cafe Lily, an Uzbek-Korean restaurant, located in Brooklyn, New York City. The Moscow Times, describe the kuksu served at Koryo-saram in Moscow's K-town as "[having] quite the kick".

Variations 
 Acorn noodle soup
 Gogi-guksu

See also 
 Korean noodles

References 

Beef dishes
Korean meat dishes
Korean cuisine
Uzbekistani cuisine